Annabel Leventon (born 20 April 1942 in Hertfordshire, England) is an English actress who has acted in various roles on stage and television. 

While reading English at the University of Oxford she made several appearances at the Oxford Playhouse and toured France as Desdemona in the Oxford University Dramatic Society's production of Othello. She then joined the Fourbeats pop group, played at the Edinburgh Festival and continued in various other OUDS productions. 

On obtaining her BA she gained a grant to LAMDA and made her professional stage debut in Leicester. In December 1967 she left for America where she joined Tom O' Horgan's La MaMa troupe in New York and worked with them for seven months before returning to Britain. She was in the original London cast of Hair in 1968 at the Shaftesbury Theatre, also directed by O'Horgan. She went on to direct and appear in the show in Paris. She also appeared in the original London production of The Rocky Horror Show.

Her first TV appearance was in The White Rabbit in 1967, and she went on to appear in a number of long-running series over the next four decades.

Her film credits include roles in Come Back Peter (1969), Le Mur de l'Atlantique (1970), Every Home Should Have One (1970), The Rocky Horror Picture Show (1975), Real Life (1984), Defence of the Realm (1986), M. Butterfly (1993), Wimbledon (2004) and A Royal Night Out (2015). 

In 2013 Leventon appeared in the role of Constance, the Madwoman of the Flea Market, in the British premiere of Jerry Herman's Dear World at the Charing Cross Theatre, London.

She is the author of The Real Rock Follies: The Great Girl Band Rip-Off of 1976, released in 2017.

TV appearances

Discography
Hair (Original London Cast Recording) 1968

References

External links 
 Official website
 

1942 births
English film actresses
English musical theatre actresses
English stage actresses
English television actresses
Living people